Prime Number published in 1970, is a collection of science fiction stories  by American writer Harry Harrison.

Contents
"Mute Milton" 
"The Greatest Car in the World" 
"The Final Battle" 
"The Powers of Observation" 
"The Ghoul Squad" 
"Toy Shop" 
"You Men of Violence" 
"The Finest Hunter in the World" 
"Down to Earth" 
"Commando Raid" 
"Not Me, Not Amos Cabot!" 
"The Secret of Stonehenge" 
"Incident in the IND" 
"If" 
"Contact Man" 
"The Pad: a Story of the Day After Tomorrow" 
"A Civil Service Servant" 
"A Criminal Act" 
"Famous First Words"

Reception
Dave Pringle reviewed Prime Number for Imagine magazine, and stated that "These early stories are mostly light and bright".

Reviews
Review by Charlie Brown (1970) in Locus, #64 September 30, 1970
Review by Nik Morton (1984) in Paperback Inferno, Volume 7, Number 4

References

1970 short story collections
Berkley Books books
Short story collections by Harry Harrison